Cerberin is a type of cardiac glycoside, a steroidal class found in the seeds of the dicotyledonous angiosperm genus Cerbera; including the suicide tree (Cerbera odollam) and the sea mango (Cerbera manghas). This class includes digitalis-like agents, channel-blockers that as a group have found historic uses as cardiac treatments, but which at higher doses are extremely toxic; in the case of cerberin, consumption of the C. odollam results in poisoning with presenting nausea, vomiting, and abdominal pain, often leading to death. The natural product has been structurally characterized, its toxicity is clear—it is often used as an intentional human poison in third-world countries, and accidental poisonings with fatalities have resulted from individuals even indirectly consuming the agent—but its potentially therapeutic pharmacologic properties are very poorly described.

Structure and synonyms 

Cerberin, like all cardiac glycosides, has as its core a steroid-type set of four carbocycles (all-carbon rings). In cerberin, this steroid core is connected, first, to a separate oxygen-containing lactone ring (shown here, upper right of box), and second, to a sugar substituent (shown in infobox structure, left of image).

There are two types of cardiac glycosides depending on the characteristics of the lactone moiety. Cerberin, with its five-membered ring, belongs to the cardenolide class; cardenolides are 23-carbon steroids with methyl groups at positions 10 and 13 of the steroid ring system, and the appended five-membered butenolide-type of lactone at C-17.

Many types of sugars can be attached to cardiac glycosides; in the case of cerberin, it is an O-acetylated derivative of α-L-thevetose, which is itself a derivative of L-glucose (6-deoxy-3-O-methyl-α-L-glucopyranose). The cardenolide substructure to which the sugar is attached has also been independently characterised, and can be referred to as digitoxigenin (see image), hence, cerberin is, synonymously, (L-2′-O-acetylthevetosyl)digitoxigenin. As well, the non-acetylated structure was independently discovered and named neriifolin, and so cerberin is, synonymously, 2′-acetylneriifolin.

Physical properties 
Cerberin is soluble in chloroform, acetone, and, moderately, in water.

Toxicity 
The literature on cerberin toxicity, per se, remains sparse; unless otherwise specifically indicated, the following is general information regarding cardiac glycoside toxicity, with an emphasis on information from cardenolides (i.e., steroid natural products bearing the same digitoxigenin substructure).

In poisoning situations, those who are poisoned by ingesting cardiac glycosides experience, within an hour, a variety of gastrointestinal and cardiac symptoms. For cerberin, these have been noted to include nausea, vomiting, and abdominal pain. Forensic sources indicate presentations for cardiac toxin poisonings that additionally include burning sensations in the mouth, diarrhea, headache, dilated pupils, irregular beating of the heart, and drowsiness; coma and death most often eventually follow. There is no clear, reported correlation between the dose and mortality (see below); death often occurs after 3–6 hours.

A historic, reported lethal dose of cerberin in dog is 1.8 mg/kg, and in cat 3.1 mg/kg; that is, it is very low.  Hence, eating the core of a fruit from the tree is sufficient for a human to receive a lethal dose, and consumption of the raw leaves of related oleander species has resulted in death.

There is significant evidence both from Cerbera and from related species, with regard to lethal poisonings. Individual cases of poisoning from Cerbera, Nerium (oleander), and related species are documented including direct and indirect, and intentional and unintentional ingestion. In one case of accidental poisoning, two vegans in Europe that were foraging for and ingesting wild plants died after consuming wild oleander. In indirect cases, human consumption of crab, where the crustacean had earlier consumed plants producing cerberin or related cardenolides, fatalities are also known.

The response of humans to cardiac glycosides in general often depends on the tissue, exposure time and the dose. These toxins act mainly on the heart, either directly or through the nerves.  Ouabain and digoxin have half-lives of about 20 and 40 hours, respectively, hence, for these agents, a few days with constant dosing are required before a steady state concentration is reached in tissues. The concentration of a cardioactive agent at steady state is called the therapeutic plasma concentration; for digoxin this value, in ng/mL, lies in the low single digits. When this value is exceeded, the dose can be toxic or life-threatening. Because of the long half-lives of cardiac glycosides, days might pass before plasma concentrations decrease to safe levels. The therapeutic index of cardiac glycosides is ≈2; this is quite narrow, indicating that only a small dose is needed for the compound to be toxic.

There are reports that treatment with potassium ion can be used to counter the toxic effects of cerberin, and gastric lavage may also be applied. Even so, cases of direct and indirect poisoning often are fatal, even when the nature and source of the toxin are rapidly identified.

Metabolism 
Very little is known about the metabolism of cerberin. For the related digoxin, another cardiac glycoside, it is in largest part excreted unchanged by the kidneys (60-80%), with the remaining mostly metabolised by the liver. The half-life for digoxin is 36–48 hours for people with a normal renal function and up to 6 days for people with a compromised renal function. This makes the renal function an important factor in the toxicity of digoxin and perhaps for cerberin as well.

Mechanism of action 
There is very little formal, modern published information on the mechanism of action of cerberin.

Cerberin, as a cardiac glycoside, is seen as binding to and inhibiting the cellular Na+/K+ -ATPase, because it binds to the alpha-subunit of the enzyme. This is the catalytic moiety. There are also a beta- and  FXYD subunits. These two subunits influence the affinity of cerberin to Na+/K+ -ATPase. The expression of the beta- and FXYD-subunit is tissue-specific. Because of this, cerberin will have different effects in different tissues. When cerberin binds to the Na+/K+-ATPase the conformation of the enzyme changes.  This will lead to the activation of signal transduction pathways in the cell.  A detailed description of the effects of cerberin in the cell is given below.

Na+/K+-ATPase pump 
Na+/K+-ATPase is an ion transport system of sodium and potassium ions and requires energy. It is often used in many types of cellular systems. Sodium ions move out of the cell and potassium ions enter the cell (3:2) with the aid of this pump. During the transport of these ions, the enzyme undergoes several changes in conformation. Including a phosphorylation and dephosphorylation step.

The transport of Na+ and K+ is important for cell survival. Cardiac glycosides, such as cerberin, alter the transport of ions against their gradient.  Cerberin is able to bind to the extracellular part of the Na+/K+-ATPase pump and can block the dephosphorylation step. Due to this inhibition it is impossible to transport sodium and potassium across the membrane and results in raising intracellular concentration of Na+.

Na+/Ca2+-exchanger 
Accumulation of intracellular sodium ions cause an increase of intracellular calcium. This is because the calcium-sodium exchange pump’s activity decreases. The calcium-sodium exchange pump exchanges Ca2+ and Na+ without the use of energy. This exchanger is essential for maintaining sodium and calcium homeostasis. The exact mechanism by which this exchanger works is unclear.  It is known that calcium and sodium can move in either direction across the membrane of muscle cells. It is also known that three sodium ions are exchanged for each calcium and that an increase in intracellular sodium concentration through this exchange mechanism leads to an increase in intracellular calcium concentration. As intracellular sodium increases, the concentration gradient driving sodium into the cell across the exchanger is reduced. As a result, the activity of the exchanger is reduced, which decreases the movement of calcium out of the cell.

Thus by inhibiting the Na+/K+-ATPase, cardiac glycosides cause intracellular sodium concentration to increase. This leads to an accumulation of intracellular calcium via the Na+/Ca2+-exchange system with the following effects:
 In the heart, increased intracellular calcium causes more calcium to be released, thereby making more calcium available to bind to troponin-C, which increases contractility (inotropy). 
 Inhibition of the Na+/K+-ATPase in vascular smooth muscle causes depolarization, which causes smooth muscle contraction.

The conformational change of Na+/K+-ATPase plays not only a role in the contraction of muscles, but also in cell growth, cell motility and apoptosis. Due to de binding of cerberin, specific second messengers can be activated. After a cascade of cellular interactions nuclear transcription factors binds to the DNA and new enzymes will be made. This enzymes can for example play a role in cell proliferation.[subscription required]

Efficacy 
There is very little formal, modern published information on the pharmacological actions of cerberin. One primary source reports that its ingestion results in electrocardiogram (ECG) changes, such as various types of bradycardia (e.g., sinus bradycardia), AV dissociation, and junctional rhythms; second-degree sinoatrial block and nodal rhythm are also described.

In the case of digitalis administration, ST depression or T wave inversion may occur without indicating toxicity; however, PR interval prolongation indicate toxicity.

Therapeutic uses 

There are no clearly established therapeutic uses of the title compound, cerberin. Digitalis compounds, related cardiac glycosides, function through the inhibition of the Na+/K+-ATPase-pump, and have been widely used for in the  treatment of chronic heart failure and arrhythmias; although newer and more efficacious treatments for heart failure are available, digitalis compounds are still used. Some cardiac glycosides have been shown to have antiproliferative and apoptotic effects, and are therefore of interest as potential agents in cancer chemotherapy; there is a single report to date of possible antiproliferative activity of cerberin.

Further reading

References 

Cardiac glycosides
Plant toxins